HVN may refer to:

 Harvey Nash, an outsourcing company
 Harvey Norman, an Australian retailer
 Havelian And Out Agency railway station, in Pakistan
 Havenhouse railway station, in England
 Hawu language, spoken in Indonesia
 Heavenly Recordings, a British record label
 Tweed New Haven Airport, New Haven, Connecticut
 Vietnam Airlines (ICAO code)